Trialestes is an extinct genus of Late Triassic (Carnian) crocodylomorphs that lived in South America. It has been classified as a dinosaur in the past due it being adapted as a terrestrial, running carnivore. It is classified in Sphenosuchia, which were early relatives of crocodylians. Irmis, Nesbitt and Sues (2013) noted that some of the material referred to this taxon is actually dinosaurian; however, according to the authors, the holotype specimen PVL 2561, found in the Cancha de Bochas Member of the Ischigualasto Formation in the Ischigualasto-Villa Unión Basin in northwestern Argentina, "comprises a single individual that preserves unambiguous crocodylomorph synapomorphies", indicating it is indeed a crocodylomorph, and one of the referred specimens, PVL 3889, does share one or more autapomorphies with the holotype, indicating it represents the same taxon. The type species, T. romeri, was named in 1963.

References

External links 
 Trialestidae at Palaeos
 Illustration of Trialestes

Terrestrial crocodylomorphs
Triassic crocodylomorpha
Carnian genera
Late Triassic reptiles of South America
Triassic Argentina
Fossils of Argentina
Ischigualasto Formation
Fossil taxa described in 1982
Taxa named by José Bonaparte
Prehistoric pseudosuchian genera